This is a list of cricketers who have played first-class, List A or Twenty20 cricket for Tripura cricket team. Ihe team plays in Indian domestic cricket and was granted first-class status in 1985.

B
Rajesh Banik
Subrata Banik
Bijan Bhattacharjee

C
Timir Chanda

D
Shankar Das
Babul Datta
Samir Deb
Mitan Debbarma
Jayanta Debnath
Sibram Dey
Rajib Dutta

G
Mihir Das Gupta
Pallab Das Gupta

J
Vineet Jain

L
Satrajit Lahiri

M
Samir Mujumdar
Manisankar Murasingh

N
Bijoy Nath

P
Biswajit Paul

R
Monimoy Roy

S
Rajat Kanti Sen

Notes

References

Tripura cricketers

cricketers